Oban is an unincorporated area administered by the rural municipality of Biggar No. 347, in the Canadian province of Saskatchewan.  Oban is located on Saskatchewan Highway 14 in western Saskatchewan.  The closest town is Biggar to the southeast.  Biggar railway station is a divisional point for the Canadian National Railway (CNR). Oban had the last provincial interlocking tower at the Canadian National Railway and Canadian Pacific Railway level crossing, which was constructed in 1910 and closed in 1990.

History
The name Oban is from the community Oban in Argyll, Scotland.

Economy
The community had a grain elevator and post office till the 1960s.  The Oban Salt Company opened in 1937.

Law and government
The Reeve and council of Biggar No. 347, Saskatchewan RM provide the rural area with government and infrastructure maintenance.  Oban is within the provincial constituency of Biggar and elects a Member of the Legislative Assembly (M.L.A.)  Oban is represented by a member of Parliament (MP) representing the federal electoral district of Saskatoon—Rosetown—Biggar.

Demographics
The population is enumerated as a part of the RM of Biggar No. 347, Saskatchewan. These statistics are for the RM.

N/A = Data Not Available

Education
Historically Oban School District #4733  was located at Township 37, Range  16 West of the 3rd Meridian.

Transportation
In 1925 Oban was located on the Minnedosa–Saskatoon–Edmonton CPR branch line between Castlewood, and Naseby.  The CPR was intersected by the CNR GTP West.  Oban was located on the CNR between Biggar and Palo.  Oban was also a part of the Porter Subdivision, CNR between Lett and Biggar.

Infrastructure

Oban had the last provincial interlocking tower at the Canadian National Railway and Canadian Pacific Railway level crossing which was constructed in 1910 and closed in 1990.  The tower has been moved to the Saskatchewan Railway Museum.

Oban tower was a requirement for the Grand Trunk Pacific Railway when it wanted to cross the existing CPR rail tracks. (The Canadian Northern Railway was amalgamated with the Grand Trunk Railway by the Dominion Government to form the Canadian National Railways in 1919.) Oban tower consisted of a 16-frame interlocking machine. There were levers attached to pipes and cranks which controlled semaphore signals and train derails.  If an approaching train did not react to the signals at the crossing, the derails were utilized, causing a minor accident and averting a major collision.  The signals would be operated  and  along the railway track.  At  the derail would be set if the train could not stop before the intersection.

There have been  railway track in the province of Saskatchewan.  Rail companies were intersected 58 times at level crossings. Some of these were railway lines crossing municipal street car rail lines.  There were 36 Saskatchewan crossings which were controlled by mechanical interlocking machines between the early 1900s and 1990.

Photo gallery

See also
List of communities in Saskatchewan
List of rural municipalities in Saskatchewan

References

Further reading
 Title A Harvest of Memories: Oban, Neola, Avalon, Elwell, Monarch, Louvain, Kensmith, Twin Hill, Fairmount, Vanceview, Gagenville, Curths Hill, Castlewood, Whiteshore, Wilson Lake / [editor: Isla Solanik] or the North Biggar history
Published Biggar, Sask.: North Biggar History Book Committee, 1986

Biggar No. 347, Saskatchewan
Unincorporated communities in Saskatchewan